, better known by his pen name , was a Japanese comic writer of the Edo period.

Major works
Ukiyoburo
Ukiyodoko

References

1776 births
1822 deaths
Japanese writers of the Edo period